Star Com Productions LLC is an American independent film and live event production company founded in January 2000 by American Director/Producer J.C. Schroder.  Star Com Productions is associated with the Miami Valley Film Association.

Live Events
Star Com has produced or assisted with more than 70 large-scale productions, which include the following clients/credits:
Oxford International Film Festival
REO Speedwagon
Bill Cosby
Paramount Parks
PBS
Michael W. Smith
MercyMe
Jeremy Camp
Jesse McCartney
AR Rahman
Third Day
Toby Mac
Firehouse
Rebecca St. James
Audio Adrenaline
Kutless

Films
40 Miles (pre-production)
Forever's End (2013) 
Slipping Away (working title) (pre-production) 
For Today (2010) (short)
The End of All Things (2008) (short)
Freedomland (2007) (short)
Hopes & Dreams (2007) (short)
Doorways (2006) (short)

References

External links
Star Com Productions Official Site
Star Com Productions IMDB Entry
Oxford International Film Festival Official Site

Film production companies of the United States